Jacques Fey (born 20 June 1989 in Longjumeau) is a French footballer who plays as a midfielder. He appeared in the Bulgarian A PFG for Etar 1924.

References

External links 

1989 births
Living people
French footballers
Louhans-Cuiseaux FC players
ES Viry-Châtillon players
Athlético Marseille players
FC Etar 1924 Veliko Tarnovo players
First Professional Football League (Bulgaria) players
French expatriate footballers
Expatriate footballers in Bulgaria
People from Longjumeau
Association football midfielders
Footballers from Essonne